The Center for WorkLife Law ("WorkLife Law" or "WLL") is a non-partisan research and advocacy group housed at the University of California, Hastings College of the Law in San Francisco, California. WorkLife Law seeks to advance gender and racial equality at work and in higher education through practical initiatives. WLL staff advocate for changes in policies that discriminate against women and people of color and create research-based, actionable tools for companies and individuals to use to address discrimination in their workplaces and schools. WLL has many initiatives and programs to target different types of discrimination, including those focused on pregnancy, breast-feeding, and caregiving discrimination.  WLL was founded in 1998 and is currently led by Joan C. Williams.

References

Advocacy groups in the United States
1998 establishments in California